Zonitidae, common name the true glass snails, are a family of mostly rather small, air-breathing land snails, terrestrial pulmonate gastropod mollusks in the superfamily Zonitoidea.

Zonitidae is the only family in the superfamily Zonitoidea. The family's type genus is Zonites, established by Pierre Denys de Montfort in 1810. This family has no subfamilies (according to the taxonomy of the Gastropoda by Bouchet & Rocroi, 2005).

Distribution
The distribution of the Zonitidae encompasses the western Palearctic.

Shell description
The spiral, heliciform shells of these snails are flattened in shape with a very low spire. The shell is perforate or umbilicate. The lip of the aperture is simple, lacking thickened margin. These shells are more or less transparent as if made of glass, hence the popular name "glass snails". The shells are colorless or of an amber to brownish color.

Biology 
Some snails in genera within this family create and use love darts as part of their mating behavior.

In this family, the number of haploid chromosomes lies between 21 and 25 and also lies between 31 and 35, but other values are also possible (according to the values in this table).

Ecology
These snails live in damp places under stones and similar objects. The true glass snails are usually nocturnal.

Genera
Genera within the family Zonitidae include:
 Aegopis Fitzinger, 1833
 Aegopinella Lindholm, 1927
 Allaegopis Riedel, 1979
 Balcanodiscus Riedel & Urbanski, 1964
 Brazieria Ancey, 1887
 Doraegopis Riedel, 1982
 Eopolita Pollonera, 1916
Glyphyalinia Martens, 1892 
 Gollumia Riedel, 1988
 Meledella Sturany, 1908
 Mesomphix Rafinesque, 1819
 Ogaridiscus Dall, 1877
 Paraegopis Hesse, 1910
 Paravitrea Pilsbry, 1898
 Retinella Fischer, 1877
 Thasiogenes Riedel, 1998
 Troglaegopis Riedel & Radja, 1983
 Turcozonites Riedel, 1987
Ventridens Binney & Bland, 1869
 Zonites Montfort, 1810 – type genus

Cladogram
The following cladogram shows the phylogenic relationships of this family to other families in the limacoid clade:

References

Further reading
 Riedel A. The Zonitidae of Greece. Fauna Graeciae V. 194 pp.
 Schileyko A. A. (2003). "Treatise on recent terrestrial pulmonate mollusks. 10. Ariophantidae, Ostracolethaidae, Ryssotidae, Milacidae, Dyakiidae, Staffordiidae, Gastrodontidae, Zonitidae, Daudebardiidae, Parmacellidae". Ruthenica, Supplement 2. 1309–1466.

 
Extant Paleocene first appearances